Shawn Willis (born September 30, 1983) was an American football fullback who last played for San Jose SaberCats of the Arena Football League (AFL). He did not see any playing time in his lone season with the team (2007); he did, however, win an AFL Championship when the SaberCats defeated the Columbus Destroyers in ArenaBowl XXI at the end of the season. Willis was placed on the team's injured reserve list on February 18, 2008; he was waived by the SaberCats five days later.

Willis was born in Flatonia, Texas; he attended Flatonia Secondary School, where he starred as a running back. Following his graduation, he played collegiate football at Oklahoma State University. He appeared in 38 games as a running back (starting 16); following the conclusion of his collegiate career, however, he was not selected in the NFL Draft. During his time at Oklahoma State, Willis majored in Microbiology/Medical Technology. He currently resides in Flatonia, Texas.

References

1983 births
Living people
American football fullbacks
Oklahoma State Cowboys football players
San Jose SaberCats players
Players of American football from Texas
People from Fayette County, Texas